Dotun Olatunji (born 22 December 1979) is a Nigerian cricketer. He played in the 2013 ICC World Cricket League Division Six tournament.

References

External links
 

1979 births
Living people
Nigerian cricketers
Place of birth missing (living people)
Yoruba sportspeople